Girișu de Criș is a commune in Bihor County, Crișana, Romania with a population of 3,588 people. It is composed of two villages, Girișu de Criș and Tărian (Köröstarján).

References

Communes in Bihor County
Localities in Crișana